Riverside Historic District is a national historic district located at New Bern, Craven County, North Carolina. It encompasses 101 contributing buildings and 4 contributing sites developed as a suburban residential neighborhood in New Bern between 1894 and 1921.  The district is characterized by dwellings in the Classical Revival, Queen Anne, and Bungalow / American Craftsman styles. Notable non-residential buildings include the Riverside Graded School, Riverside United Methodist Church, S. B. Parker Company Building, Sadler's store, and Hawkins Grocery Store.

It was listed on the National Register of Historic Places in 1988.

References

Historic districts on the National Register of Historic Places in North Carolina
Neoclassical architecture in North Carolina
Queen Anne architecture in North Carolina
Geography of Craven County, North Carolina
Buildings and structures in New Bern, North Carolina
National Register of Historic Places in Craven County, North Carolina